Dallmann is a surname. Notable people with the surname include:

 Eduard Dallmann (1830–1896), German whaler, trader, and Polar explorer
 Petra Dallmann (born 1978), German swimmer
 Werner Dallmann (1924–1945), German Obersturmführer (first lieutenant)

German-language surnames